Argyrodes lepidus is a species of tangle web spider in the genus Argyrodes found in New Zealand.

References

Theridiidae
Spiders of New Zealand
Spiders described in 1879